Kavnai Fort is located in a hillock, north of Kavanai village in Igatpuri Taluka of the Nashik district in the Indian state of Maharashtra. The main gate and a small pond are the only remaining structures.

Geography 
Kavanai village is connected by a road to Igatpuri. Igatpuri is located 18 kilometers away. Kapilatirth is located near the Kavnai village.  

The ascent to the fort follows a ridge that starts from Kavanai. The final ascent is vertical, with poor rock-cut steps crossed by a ladder.

History 
The fort was built by Moghuls. It was ceded to Peshvas by Nizam under the terms of the treaty after the Battle of Udgir (1760). This fort, along with Tringalwadi and fifteen others were captured by the British army under the leadership of Col. Briggs.

Gallery

References

Forts in Maharashtra